A number of species of non-marine molluscs are found in the wild in Algeria.

Freshwater gastropods 

Hydrobiidae
 Mercuria bourguignati Glöer, Bouzid & Boeters, 2010
 Mercuria gauthieri Glöer, Bouzid & Boeters, 2010
 Mercuria globulina (Letourneux & Bourguignat, 1887)
 Mercuria pycnocheilia (Bourguignat, 1862)
 Mercuria saharica (Bourguignat, 1887)
 Pseudamnicola algeriensis Glöer, Bouzid & Boeters, 2010
 Pseudamnicola boucheti Glöer, Bouzid & Boeters, 2010
 Pseudamnicola calamensis Glöer, Bouzid & Boeters, 2010
 Pseudamnicola chabii Glöer, Bouzid & Boeters, 2010
 Pseudamnicola constantinae (Letourneux, 1870)
 Pseudamnicola dupotetiana (Forbes, 1838)
 Pseudamnicola fineti Glöer, Bouzid & Boeters, 2010
 Pseudamnicola gerhardfalkneri Glöer, Bouzid & Boeters, 2010
 Pseudamnicola ghamizii Glöer, Bouzid & Boeters, 2010
 Pseudamnicola letourneuxiana (Bourguignat, 1862)
 Pseudamnicola linae Glöer, Bouzid & Boeters, 2010
 Pseudamnicola luteola (Küster, 1852)
 Pseudamnicola meluzzi Boeters, 1976
 Pseudamnicola numidica (Clessin, 1878)
 Pseudamnicola rouagi Glöer, Bouzid & Boeters, 2010

Planorbidae
 Armiger crista (Linnaeus, 1758)
 Hippeutis complanatus (Linnaeus, 1758)
 Bulinus truncatus (Michaud, 1829)
 Ferrissia californica (Rowell, 1863)
 Planorbis planorbis (Linnaeus, 1758)

Land gastropods 

Pomatiidae
 Tudorella sulcata (Draparnaud, 1805)

Cochlostomatidae
 Cochlostoma atlanticum (Bourguignat, 1868)

Spiraxidae
 Poiretia algira (Bruguière, 1792)

Chondrinidae
 Granopupa granum (Draparnaud, 1801)
 Rupestrella michaudi (Bourguignat, 1862)

Enidae
 Mastus pupa (Linnaeus, 1758)
 Mauronapaeus terverii (Forbes, 1838)

Ferussaciidae
 Ferussacia folliculum (Schröter, 1784)
 Ferussacia carnea (Risso, 1826)

Discidae
 Discus rotundatus (Müller, 1774)

Punctidae
 Paralaoma servilis (Shuttleworth, 1852)

Milacidae
 Milax gagates (Draparnaud, 1801)
 Milax nigricans (Schulz in Philippi, 1836)

Sphincterochilidae
 Sphincterochila candidissima (Draparnaud, 1801)
 Sphincterochila otthianus (Bourguignat, 1864)
 Sphincterochila piestius (Bourguignat, 1864)

Valloniidae
 Plagyrona placida (Shuttleworth, 1852)

Subulinidae
 Rumina decollata (Linnaeus, 1758)

Testacellidae
 Testacella fischeriana Bourguignat, 1861
 Testacella riedeli Giusti, Manganelli et Schembri, 1995

Agriolimacidae
 Deroceras riedelianum Wiktor, 1983

Limacidae
 Ambigolimax nyctelius (Bourguignat, 1861)

Trissexodontidae
 Caracollina lenticula (Férussac, 1821)

Hygromiidae
 Ganula flava (Terver, 1839)

Geomitridae
 Cochlicella barbara (Linnaeus, 1758)
 Cochlicella conoidea (Draparnaud, 1801)
 Trochoidea elegans (Gmelin, 1791)
 Trochoidea pyramidata (Brown, 1827)
 Xerosecta cespitum (Draparnaud, 1801)
 Xerotricha conspurcata (Draparnaud, 1801)

Helicidae
 Archelix juilleti Terver, 1839
 Archelix lactea (Müller, 1774)
 Archelix polita punctatiana Gassies, 1836
 Archelix punctata (Müller, 1774)
 Archelix wagneri Terver, 1839
 Archelix zapharina Terver, 1839
 Cantareus apertus (Born, 1778)
 Cantareus koraegaelius (Bourguignat in Locard, 1882)
 Cantareus subapertus (Ancey, 1893)
 Cochlicella acuta (O. F. Müller, 1774)
 Eobania vermiculata (O. F. Müller, 1774)
 Euparypha pisana (O. F. Müller, 1774)
 Helicella acompsia (Bourguignat, 1864)
 Helicella globuloïdea (Terver, 1839)
 Helicella lauta (R. T. Lowe, 1831)
 Helicella pyramidata (Draparnaud, 1805)
 Helicella terveri Michaud, 1831
 Helicella virgata (da Costa, 1778)
 Helix (Alabastrina) alabastrites Michaud, 1833
 Helix (Alabastrina) soluta Michaud, 1833
 Helix aspersa (Müller, 1774)
 Macularia hieroglyphicula Michaud, 1833
 Macularia jourdaniana Bourguignat, 1867
 Massylaea constantina (Forbes, 1838)

Freshwater bivalves

Sphaeriidae
 Musculium lacustre (O.F. Müller, 1774)

See also

Lists of molluscs of surrounding countries:
 List of non-marine molluscs of Morocco, Wildlife of Morocco
 List of non-marine molluscs of Tunisia, Wildlife of Tunisia
 List of non-marine molluscs of Libya, Wildlife of Libya
 Wildlife of Mauritania
 Wildlife of Western Sahara
 Wildlife of Mali
 Wildlife of Niger

References

 Non marine moll

Molluscs
Algeria
Algeria